Luisa Fatiaki Taitapu Peters (born 27 June 1993) is a weightlifter from the Cook Islands, who competes in the +75 kg weight division. She participated in two Olympics (2012, 2016) and three Commonwealth Games (2010, 2014, 2018) with the best result of fifth place in 2018. She won a bronze medal at the 2015 Pacific Games.

Peters took up weightlifting aged 16. In 2016, she was elected on a four-year term as a vice president of the Oceania Weightlifting Federation, becoming its first female official.

Major results

References

External links

 
 
 

Living people
Olympic weightlifters of the Cook Islands
Weightlifters at the 2012 Summer Olympics
Weightlifters at the 2016 Summer Olympics
1993 births
People from Rarotonga
Commonwealth Games competitors for the Cook Islands
Weightlifters at the 2010 Commonwealth Games
Weightlifters at the 2014 Commonwealth Games
Cook Island female weightlifters
Weightlifters at the 2018 Commonwealth Games